WHBB (1490  AM) is a radio station licensed to serve Selma, Alabama, United States.  The station is owned by Broadsouth Communications, Inc. WHBB serves the greater Central Alabama region with a 1,000 watt signal at 1490 kHz.

Programming
WHBB airs a variety format featuring a mix of News, Talk and Gospel music. Local weekday programming includes the Viewpoint call-in talk show with Randy Williams and The Gospel Caravan with Rev. Thomas J. Patterson.  Notable syndicated programming includes "The Savage Nation" Hosted by Dr. Michael Savage, "The Chris Plante Show" with Chris Plante, "InfoWars" With Alex Jones and Coast to Coast AM hosted by George Noory. News coverage is delivered locally 12 times daily and as hourly news updates from Fox News Radio.

History
The station, assigned the WHBB call letters by the Federal Communications Commission, signed on in 1935 with a 250 watt signal.

In July 1984, WHBB applied to increase its maximum broadcast power to 1,000 watts and relocate the transmitter to its current location. It received a construction permit from the FCC on November 9, 1984. WHBB received a license to cover at the new signal strength from the FCC on January 31, 1985.

In September 1984, Talton Broadcasting Company reached an agreement to sell this station to Holder Communications Corporation.  The deal was approved by the FCC on November 14, 1984, and the transaction was consummated on January 10, 1985.

In June 1992, Holder Communications Corporation completed a deal to sell WHBB to Broadsouth Communications, Inc.  The deal was approved by the FCC on July 24, 1992, and the transaction was consummated on August 4, 1992.

References

External links

News and talk radio stations in the United States
Jazz radio stations in the United States
Gospel radio stations in the United States
Radio stations established in 1935
1935 establishments in Alabama
HBB